Lillian Spencer may refer to:

 Lillian Spencer (Coronation Street), a character on Coronation Street
 Lillian White Spencer (1876–1953), Colorado poet